DMG Mori Seiki is the name of two companies:
 DMG Mori Seiki AG, a German machine tool building company
 DMG Mori Seiki Co., a Japanese machine tool building company